Punta Delgada may refer to:

Punta Delgada, Argentina, a small settlement on the Valdes Peninsula
Punta Delgada, Chile, a small town in Magallanes Province
Punta Delgada, Spain, a headland on the island of Alegranza, Canary Islands

See also 
Ponta Delgada (Azores), sometimes misspelled Punta Delgada
Ponta Delgada (disambiguation)